The 2006–07 Solomon Islands National Club Championship was the 4th season of the National Club Championship in the Solomon Islands. KOSSA won the league for the first time. All matches were played at the hillside ground called Lawson Tama Stadium, with an approximate capacity of 20,000.

Teams 
 Auki Kingz
 Avaiki Chiefs Warriors
 FK Kokohale FC
 Katova FC
 Koloale
 KOSSA
 Marist
 Northern Warriors
 Paratasi

Knockout stage

Semi-finals

Final

References 

Solomon Islands S-League seasons
2006 in Solomon Islands sport
2007 in Solomon Islands sport